The women's 400 metres hurdles at the 2017 Asian Athletics Championships was held on 7 and 8 July.

Medalists

Results

Heats

Qualification rule: First 2 in each heat (Q) and the next 2 fastest (q) qualified for the final.

Final

References

400
400 metres hurdles at the Asian Athletics Championships